The list of ship launches in 1848 includes a non-exhaustive, chronological list of ships launched in 1848.


References 

1848
Ship launches